Wallace Masterman (29 January 1888 – 24 January 1965) was an English footballer who played for Stockton on Tees, Gainsborough Trinity and Sheffield United. He was skilful and elegant forward who scored many goals.

Career
Masterman started playing in the North East of England with Stockton on Tees, at that time playing in the  Northern League, he was very successful scoring 36 goals in one season. Following this success he transferred to Gainsborough Trinity a 2nd Division side before signing for Sheffield United in May 1914.

He had an excellent first season, playing regularly in the first team as they reached the FA Cup final in 1915. Appearing in the final Masterman almost scored, hitting the cross bar, but the ball rebounded out of the goal, Stanley Fazackerley then headed it past the Chelsea goalkeeper for the Blades second goal.

Upon the outbreak of World War I he joined the Coldstream Guards but returned to Sheffield after being medically discharged.  He played regularly in the wartime football competitions and remained with The Blades once competitive matches recommenced in 1918.  He picked up a serious knee injury in March 1919 and struggled for fitness from that time on.

Masterman transferred to Stoke in May 1920 but failed to make an appearance in the first team.  He returned to Sheffield on his retirement and lived there until his death in 1965.

Career statistics
Source:

Honours
Sheffield United
FA Cup: 1914–15

References

1888 births
1965 deaths
Footballers from Newcastle upon Tyne
English footballers
English Football League players
Association football forwards
Stockton F.C. players
Gainsborough Trinity F.C. players
Sheffield United F.C. players
Stoke City F.C. players
Coldstream Guards soldiers
FA Cup Final players
British Army personnel of World War I